Mulki Sunder Ram Shetty (1915-1981) was an Indian Banker. He was associated with Vijaya Bank since 1946 and joined the board of directors of the bank as Chairman from 1962, became the Hon. Chairman from 1962 to 1969 resulting in growth of Vijaya bank. and then remained as full-time Chairman till 1978. Under the Chairmanship of Shri Mulki Sunder Ram Shetty, Vijaya Bank steadily grew into a large All India Bank with nine smaller banks merging with it during 1963-1968. During the year 1965, the Bank registered its own logo.

Biography
Mulki Sunder Ram Shetty was born in a Tulu-speaking Tuluva Bunt community to Bommerabettu Muddana Shetty and Kakwaguttu Seethamma Shetty on April 30, 1915 in Kakwaguthu lineage of Mulki. He underwent high school education in St Aloysius, Mangaluru. He began his career in insurance and banking by working for various companies initially namely Tropical, Warden, Crescent, Atlas & Triton. Later he joined Vijaya Bank in 1946 and became a part of its growth story. The bank was initially established by A. B. Shetty to aid large scale farming in the erstwhile South Canara district of Madras Presidency on 23 October 1931. The bank diversified and first became a Scheduled bank in 1958 and then grew due to merging of nine smaller banks into it between 1963-68. The credit for this merger as well as growth goes to Mulki Sunder Ram Shetty, who was then the Chief Executive of the bank. Shetty served as full-time chairman of the bank until 1978 and died in 1981.

A college was established in his memory in Shirva, Udupi district, India, a locality in Bangalore and the road lane stretch between Hampankatta Junction and Ambedkar Circle will be formally renamed after him

References

Mangaloreans
Businesspeople from Mangalore
Tulu people
Indian bankers
1981 deaths
1915 births